The San Sebastian Stags and San Sebastian Lady Stags are the volleyball teams of San Sebastian College-Recoletos.

History

Men's volleyball

The San Sebastian Stags Men's volleyball team claimed their first championship title in NCAA in 1971. As of now, San Sebastian Stags Men's volleyball team has 9 championship title. Their last championship title was in 2005.

Women's volleyball

San Sebastian Lady Stags joined NCAA in 1969. They have the longest champion streak in NCAA history with 10 from 1987 to 1997. They also have the most championships overall with 23. Their last championship was in 2011.

The San Sebastian Lady Stags also joined Shakey's Super League and V-League in 2022.

Honors

Men's
NCAA (9)
Season 48 - (1971-1972)
Season 49 - (1972-1973)
Season 61 - (1984-1985)
Season 70 - (1994-1995)
Season 71 - (1995-1996)
Season 72 - (1996-1997)
Season 78 - (2002-2003)
Season 79 - (2003-2004)
Season 80 - (2004-2005)

Women's
NCAA (23)
Season 59 - (1982-1983)
Season 60 - (1983-1984)
Season 61 - (1984-1985)
Season 63 - (1986-1987)
Season 64 - (1987-1988)
Season 65 - (1988-1989)
Season 66 - (1990-1991)
Season 67 - (1991-1992)
Season 68 - (1992-1993)
Season 69 - (1993-1994)
Season 70 - (1994-1995)
Season 71 - (1995-1996)
Season 72 - (1996-1997)
Season 75 - (1999-2000)
Season 76 - (2000-2001)
Season 77 - (2001-2002)
Season 78 - (2002-2003)
Season 81 - (2005-2006)
Season 82 - (2006-2007)
Season 83 - (2007-2008)
Season 84 - (2008-2009)
Season 85 - (2009-2010)
Season 86 - (2010-2011)

Shakeys V League
 2nd Season (2nd Conference) -  3rd place
  3rd Season (1st Conference) -  Runner-up 
 4th Season (1st Conference) -  Runner-up 
 4th Season (2nd Conference) -  Runner-up 
 5th Season (1st Conference) -  3rd place 
 5th Season (2nd Conference) - Champions 
 6th Season (1st Conference) -  Runner-up 
 7th Season (1st Conference) -  Runner-up 
 7th Season (2nd Conference) -  Runner-up
 8th Season (Open) -  Runner-up
 9th Season (1st Conference) -  3rd place

Men's volleyball team roster

NCAA Season 95

Women's volleyball team roster

NCAA Season 97

Notable players
Men's
 Roger Gorayeb
Women's
Grethcel Soltones 
 - NCAA Season 90 MVP
 - NCAA Season 91 MVP & Best Scorer
 - NCAA Season 91 MVP (beach volleyball)
 - NCAA Season 91 beach volleyball champions
 - NCAA Season 92 MVP & 1st Best Outside Spiker
 - 2016 SVL Open Conference Conference MVP
 - 2017 PVL Reinforced Conference 2nd Best Outside Spiker
 - 2017 PVL Open Conference Finals MVP and 2nd Best Outside Spiker
Alyssa Eroa
 - NCAA Season 91 Best Digger
 - NCAA Season 91 beach volleyball champions
 - NCAA Season 92 Best Libero
 - NCAA Season 93 Best Libero
Dangie Encarnacion
 - NCAA Season 91 beach volleyball champions
Joyce Sta. Rita
 - NCAA Season 93 2nd Best Middle Blocker
Vira Mae Guillema
 - NCAA Season 93 Best Setter
Jinni Mondejar
 - RP National Women's Volleyball Team
Angela Descalsota
 - 2004 Shakey's V-League Best Scorer
Rysabelle Devanadera
 - 2008 Shakey's V-League 2nd Conference Best Attacker
Margarita Pepito
 - 2006 Shakey's V-League 1st Conference Best Digger
 - 2007 Shakey's V-League 1st Conference Best Digger
Mary Jane Pepito
 - 2007 Shakey's V-League 2nd Conference Best Receiver
 - 2007 Shakey's V-League 2nd Conference Hustle Player of the Conference
 - 2008 Shakey's V-League 1st Conference Best Receiver
 - 2008 Shakey's V-League 2nd Conference Best Receiver
Laurence Anne Latigay
 - 2007 Shakey's V-League Power Player of the Conference (Season 4 Conference 2)
 - 2008 Shakey's V-League 2nd Conference MVP and Best Scorer
Charisse Vernon Ancheta
 - 2007 Shakey's V-League 2nd Conference Best Setter
Jaroensri Bualee
 - 2007 Shakey's V-League 1st Conference Best Scorer & Conference MVP
 - 2007 Shakey's V-League 2nd Conference Best Attacker
Jennifer Bohawe
Joy Pulido

Setter: Charisse Ancheta
Middle: Rysabelle Devanadera
Open: Laurence Ann Latigay
Utility: Jinni Mondejar
Middle: Suzanne Roces
Open: Margarita Pepito
Libero: Mary Jane Pepito
Head Coach: Roger Gorayeb

See also
 San Sebastian College-Recoletos
 San Sebastian Stags basketball
 San Sebastian Stags

References

San Sebastian College – Recoletos
University Athletic Association of the Philippines women's volleyball teams
College men's volleyball in the Philippines
Men's volleyball teams in the Philippines
Women's volleyball teams in the Philippines